KUBE or Kube may refer to:

Broadcasting 
 KUBE (AM), a radio station (1350 FM) licensed to serve Pueblo, Colorado
 KUBE-TV, a television station licensed to serve Houston, Texas, United States
 Kube Radio, a student radio station at Keele University in Staffordshire, England
 KJR-FM, a radio station (93.3 FM) licensed to serve Seattle, Washington, which held the call sign KUBE-FM from 1982 to 2016 and 2018 to 2022
 KTDD (FM), a radio station (104.9 FM) licensed to serve Eatonville, Washington, United States, which held the call sign KUBE from 2016 to 2017
 KPWK (AM), a radio station (1350 AM) licensed to serve San Bernardino, California, United States, which held the call sign KUBE from 2017 to 2018

People 
 Kube (rapper), Finnish rapper
 Michael P. Kube-McDowell, American novelist
 Wilhelm Kube, German politician and Nazi official

Other uses
 An abbreviation of "Kubernetes", a software tool